Lucidworks, a San Francisco, California-based company that specializes in commerce, customer service, and workplace applications.

Lucidworks was founded in 2007 under the name Lucid Imagination and launched in 2009. The company was later renamed Lucidworks in 2012.

The Lucidworks founding technical team consisted of Marc Krellenstein, Grant Ingersoll, Erik Hatcher, and Yonik Seeley, in addition to advisor Doug Cutting.  Will Hayes is Lucidworks CEO.

Business model
Lucidworks operates primarily with a subscription-based business model with their Lucidworks Fusion platform for designing, building, and deploying big data applications. Lucidworks also offers subscriptions for the support, training, and integration services that help customers in using open source search software.

On September 18, 2014, Lucidworks released Lucidworks Fusion, a platform for building search and discovery applications that includes popular search technology Apache Solr and computation framework Apache Spark in its core.

On May 10, 2017, Lucidworks announced its acquisition of Twigkit, a software company specializing in user experiences for search and big data applications which was later integrated into the Fusion platform as Fusion App Studio.

In September 2017, Reddit teamed with Lucidworks to build their new search application.

On March 6, 2018, Lucidworks released Lucidworks Site Search, an embeddable, easy-to-configure, out-of-the-box site search solution that runs in the cloud, or on premise.

Funding 
The company received Series A funding from Basis Technology, Granite Ventures, and Walden International in Sept 2008; In-Q-Tel is a strategic investor. In August 2014, Lucidworks closed an $8 million Series C round with Shasta Ventures, Basis Technology, Granite Ventures and Walden International participating. In November 2015, Lucidworks closed a $21 million Series D round with Allegis Capital, and existing investors Shasta Ventures and Granite Ventures participating. In May 2018, the firm announced a $50 million Series E led by Top Tier Capital Partners, with participation from Silver Lake's growth capital fund, Silver Lake Waterman. In August 2019, Lucidworks announced $100M in Series F funding led by Francisco Partners and TPG Sixth Street Partners, with existing investors Top Tier Capital Partners, Shasta Ventures, Granite Ventures and Allegis participating.

Awards 
 Finalist for the 2010 Red Herring 100 North America Award
 Lucid Imagination Congratulates Apache Solr on InfoWorld Bossie Award Win
 Winner, InfoWorld 2017 Technology of the Year

References

External links
 Official website

American companies established in 2007
Search engine software
Software companies based in the San Francisco Bay Area
Information retrieval organizations
Big data companies
Software companies of the United States
2007 establishments in California
Software companies established in 2007